Dawn Kathreen Skye MacDonald is a British actress who has played Kirstie Collins in Holby City, and she has appeared in Soldier Soldier, Murphy's Law and  Doctors

Acting credits
Life Begins (Lizzie) Granada
Murphy's Law (Daisy) BBC
Holby City (Dr Kirsty Collins) BBC
The Thin Blue Line (Photo girl) Tiger Aspect
Soldier, Soldier (Julie) ITV
London Bridge (Allie Walker)
Innocents (Kay Armstrong) Channel 4

External links
Dawn McDaniel's web-site

British television actresses
British soap opera actresses
Year of birth missing (living people)
Living people
Alumni of RADA